Shovel Knight Pocket Dungeon is a dungeon crawler puzzle game developed by Vine and Yacht Club Games, and published by Yacht Club Games. It is a spin-off of Shovel Knight. It was released on December 13, 2021 for Windows, PlayStation 4, and Nintendo Switch. The story follows protagonist Shovel Knight as he becomes trapped within a magical artifact, the Pocket Dungeon, and is forced to fight his way out while battling other knights who befell the same fate. The game was positively received by critics, who noted its graphics, soundtrack and easy-to-learn yet deep gameplay as strong points.

Gameplay 
The game's core gameplay has the player control Shovel Knight or another playable character, moving them around on an 8x8 grid and clearing enemies and blocks that drop from above by moving into them to attack. If the player does not defeat an enemy, they take damage equivalent to that enemy's offensive stat.

Reception 

The game received an aggregate score of 84/100 on PC, 83/100 on Switch, and 80/100 on PlayStation 4 from Metacritic, indicating "generally favorable reviews".

Kyle LeClair of Hardcore Gamer rated the PC version 4/5 points, calling the core gameplay easy to learn, yet having a deep level of strategy. Calling the graphics "amazing", he referred to the game itself as a "true gem".

Jenni Lada of Siliconera rated the PC version 8/10 points, calling the game "immensely satisfying" and praising its supplemental modes, such as VS mode. Mitchell Salzman of IGN also rated it 8/10 points, calling it "hard to put down", and noting its "incredible soundtrack". However, he criticized the game's unlockable relics as lacking in utility, saying the most universally useful ones were part of the starting 15. He also criticized the game's lack of online play, as it contains only local multiplayer.

References

2021 video games
Dungeon crawler video games
Falling block puzzle games
Fantasy video games
Indie video games
GameMaker Studio games
Multiplayer and single-player video games
Nintendo Switch games
PlayStation 4 games
Pocket Dungeon
Video game spin-offs
Windows games
MacOS games
Yacht Club Games games